Ollaraya District is one of seven districts of the province Yunguyo in Puno, Peru.

History 
Tinicachi District was created by Law No. 24019 (December 24, 1984), in second term of Fernando Belaúnde Terry.

Ethnic groups 
The people in the district are mainly indigenous citizens of Aymara descent. Aymara is the language which the majority of the population (80.95%) learnt to speak in childhood, 18.81% of the residents started speaking using the Spanish language (2007 Peru Census).

Authorities

Mayors 
 2011-2014: Pastor Alvarez Nina. 
 2007-2010: Alexander Bryan Uchasara Mamani.

Festivities 
 Ascension of Jesus.
 Our Lady of Luján.

See also 
 Intini Uyu Pata
 Administrative divisions of Peru

References

External links 
 INEI Perú